Bolinopsis is a genus of ctenophores belonging to the family Bolinopsidae.

The genus has cosmopolitan distribution.

Species:

Bolinopsis ashleyi 
Bolinopsis chuni 
Bolinopsis elegans 
Bolinopsis indosinensis 
Bolinopsis infundibulum 
Bolinopsis microptera 
Bolinopsis mikado 
Bolinopsis ovalis 
Bolinopsis rubripunctata 
Bolinopsis vitrea

References

Ctenophores